Dirtyface Peak is a prominent mountain summit located immediately northwest of Lake Wenatchee in Chelan County, Washington of the United States. It is a 9.5 mile scramble with 4,300 ft of gain. Dirtyface Peak is the highest point of Dirtyface Mountain. This peak is set on land managed by the Okanogan–Wenatchee National Forest.

Geology

The North Cascades features some of the most rugged topography in the Cascade Range with craggy peaks, ridges, and deep glacial valleys. Geological events occurring many years ago created the diverse topography and drastic elevation changes over the Cascade Range leading to various climate differences.

The history of the formation of the Cascade Mountains dates back millions of years ago to the late Eocene Epoch. With the North American Plate overriding the Pacific Plate, episodes of volcanic igneous activity persisted. In addition, small fragments of the oceanic and continental lithosphere called terranes created the North Cascades about 50 million years ago. During the Pleistocene period dating back over two million years ago, glaciation advancing and retreating repeatedly scoured and shaped the landscape. Uplift and faulting in combination with glaciation have been the dominant processes which have created the tall peaks and deep valleys of the North Cascades area.

See also

 Geology of the Pacific Northwest
 Geography of the North Cascades

References

External links
 Weather forecast: Dirtyface Peak

Mountains of Chelan County, Washington
Mountains of Washington (state)
Cascade Range
North Cascades